Ancylosis morrisonella is a species of snout moth in the genus Ancylosis. It was described by Émile Louis Ragonot in 1887, and is known from the United States, including Texas, Arizona and Colorado.

References

Moths described in 1887
morrisonella
Moths of North America